Claudio Capéo is the third studio album from French singer Claudio Capéo. It was released on 15 July 2016 by Jo & Co. A deluxe edition was released on 11 November 2016 and includes four live songs. The album includes the singles "Un homme debout", "Ça va ça va" and "Riche". The album has peaked at number 1 on the French Albums Chart.

Commercial performance
On 23 July 2016, the album entered the French Albums Chart at number 1 in its first week of release, the album stayed at number 1 for five consecutive weeks and went on to be certified three times platinum with sales of 300,000 copies by the beginning of 2017. On 27 August 2016, the album entered the Belgian Walloon Albums Chart at number 87, peaking at number 9.

Singles
"Un homme debout" was released as the lead single from the album on 5 February 2016. The song peaked at number 6 on the French Singles Chart. "Ça va ça va" was released as the second single from the album on 28 September 2016. The song peaked at number 23 on the French Singles Chart. "Riche" was released as the third single from the album on 28 February 2017. The song peaked at number 27 on the French Singles Chart. "Dis le moi" was released as the fourth single from the album on 26 October 2017. The song peaked at number 191 on the French Singles Chart.

Track listing

Charts

Weekly charts

Year-end charts

Certifications

Release history

References

2016 albums